Tibet Airlines (abbreviated ) is an airline with its corporate headquarters and registered office in Lhasa, Tibet Autonomous Region, and operates scheduled domestic flights out of Lhasa Gonggar Airport.

History 
Tibet Airlines was approved by the Civil Aviation Administration of China in March 2010. It originally ordered three Airbus A319 airliners, receiving its first aircraft on 2 July 2011.

The airline commenced its inaugural route from Lhasa Gonggar Airport to Ngari Gunsa Airport on 26 July 2011 and began flights to Beijing and Shanghai later that year. The airline also announced plans to start direct flights to Europe by 2016. In February 2011, The Times of India reported that the airline was interested in starting operations in India and other countries in South and South East Asia.

The first international flight of Tibet Airlines was launched on 1 July 2016, connecting Chengdu Shuangliu International Airport and Samui Airport in Thailand. In September 2016, the airline confirmed that they had received permission to launch service to the Black Sea resort of Sochi from Sanya via Chengdu, starting in 2017.

On 8 January 2019, Finnish airport operator Finavia announced that Tibet Airlines will open a new route between Jinan, Shandong Province and Helsinki, Finland in April 2019. The route is to be operated twice weekly with Airbus A330 equipment.

Corporate affairs 
The airline has its head office and its registered office in the Lhasa Economic and Technological Development Zone, in Lhasa, Tibet Autonomous Region. It also has an office in Chengdu.

Destinations

Fleet 

, Tibet Airlines fleet consists of the following aircraft:

Incidents and accidents 
 On 12 May 2022, Tibet Airlines Flight 9833, an Airbus A319-100, veered off the runway on takeoff in Chongqing Jiangbei International Airport, causing a fire. All of the passengers and crew members on board survived, with only minor injuries sustained from the evacuation.

References

External links 

 Tibet Airlines 

Airlines established in 2010
Airlines of China
Chinese companies established in 2010
Companies based in Tibet
Economy of Lhasa
Transport in Tibet